Grantchester is a British ITV detective drama set in the 1950s in the Cambridgeshire village of Grantchester. The show first featured Anglican vicar Sidney Chambers (James Norton), and subsequently vicar William Davenport (Tom Brittney), each of whom develop a sideline in sleuthing with the help of Detective Inspector Geordie Keating, played by Robson Green.

The series is based on The Grantchester Mysteries, collections of short stories written by James Runcie. The first series was based on the six stories from the first book, Sidney Chambers and the Shadow of Death, and was broadcast in 2014. A second series aired in March and April 2016, and a third series began its run on 23 April 2017. A fourth series was announced on 12 April 2018, and it was confirmed that this would be the last to feature James Norton in the lead.

Tom Brittney as the Reverend Will Davenport took over the lead from Norton in series four. The fifth series commenced in January 2020. A sixth series was commissioned on 17 July 2020, and began transmission on 3 September 2021. A seventh series was commissioned on 28 July 2021, which started production in summer 2021 with Brittney also directing for the first time. It premiered on 11 March 2022 and concluded on 15 April 2022.

In August 2022, ITV had announced that the drama had been commissioned for an eighth series, which is scheduled to air in 2023.

Plot
In the Cambridgeshire village of Grantchester during the 1950s, Anglican vicar and former Scots Guards officer Sidney Chambers (James Norton), and subsequently his successor Will Davenport (Tom Brittney), work with the overworked Detective Inspector Geordie Keating (Robson Green) to forge an unlikely partnership in solving crimes. Keating's gruff, methodical approach to policing complements Chambers' more intuitive techniques of coaxing information from witnesses and suspects. Some sub-plots deal with Leonard Finch's homosexuality before decriminalisation of male homosexual behaviour in England and Wales (1967).

Cast

Main 
 Robson Green as DI Geordie Keating (Series 1–present), a WWII veteran.
 James Norton as the Reverend Sidney Chambers, MC (Series 1–4), Anglican vicar and former Scots Guards officer during World War II.
 Tom Brittney as the Reverend William "Will" Davenport (Series 4–present), Anglican vicar and former inner-city chaplain.
 Al Weaver as Leonard Ernest Finch (Series 1–present), a former curate who is ex-communicated from the church for being gay.
 Tessa Peake-Jones as Mrs. Sylvia Chapman (née Maguire) (Series 1–present), the vicarage's devoutly religious housekeeper.
 Kacey Ainsworth as Catherine "Cathy" Keating (Series 1—present), Geordie's wife. 
 Morven Christie as Amanda Hopkins (née Kendall) (Series 1–3), heiress and art restorer at London's Dulwich Picture Gallery with whom Sidney has a relationship.
 Nick Brimble as Jack Chapman (Series 1–present), a retired businessman who later marries Sylvia.
 Oliver Dimsdale as Daniel Marlowe (Series 2—present), a photographer who embarks on a secret relationship with Leonard.
 Charlotte Ritchie as Bonnie Davenport (née Evans) (Series 7–present), Cathy's niece who later marries Will.

Recurring 
 Skye Lucia Degruttola as Esme Keating (Series 1–present), Geordie's eldest daughter.
 Pip Torrens as Sir Edward Kendall (Series 1–2), Amanda's father.
 Fiona Button as Jennifer Chambers (Series 1–2), Sidney's younger sister who is Amanda's former classmate.
 Tom Austen as Guy Hopkins (Series 1–3), Amanda's husband, whom she later leaves and then divorces.
 Jemma Redgrave as Amelia Davenport (Series 4–present), Will's mother.
 Dominic Mafham as St John Gurney-Clifford (Series 5—present), Amelia's husband.
 Paula Wilcox as Diana (Series 5), Cathy's mother and Geordie's mother-in-law, who suffers from bipolar disorder.
 Emily Patrick as Tamara Gurney-Clifford (Series 6–present), Will's flirtatious socialite step-sister.
 Seline Hizli as Margaret Ward (Series 2–3), police secretary, who has a relationship with Sidney and later an affair with Geordie.
 Melissa Johns as Miss Jennifer Scott (Series 6–present), police secretary.
 Gary Beadle as Archdeacon Gabriel Atubo (Series 3–present), the church's first Archdeacon of colour.
 Stuart Bowman as Bishop Aubrey Gray (Series 6—present), Will's immediate superior.
 Ahmed Eljah as Curate Henry Jones (Series 6), Leonard's replacement when he is sent to prison.
 Joe Claflin as DC Billy Atkins (Series 1), Geordie's colleague.
 Lorne MacFadyen as DS Phil Wilkinson (Series 2–3), Geordie's colleague.
 Felix Scott as DI Sean Donovan (Series 4), a fellow DI assigned to work alongside Geordie.
 Bradley Hall as DC Larry Peters (Series 4–present), Geordie's colleague.
 David Troughton as DCI Benson (Series 1—2), Geordie's immediate superior.
 Michael D. Xavier as DCI Elliot Wallace (Series 7—present), Geordie's new boss, whose fiancé has a brief affair with Will.
 Pheline Roggan as Hildegard Staunton (Series 1), a young German widow with whom Sidney has a brief romance.
 Simona Brown as Violet Todd (Series 4), the daughter of a civil rights preacher, who later emigrates to the United States with Sidney.
 Lauren Carse as Ellie Harding (Series 5), an ambitious journalist who develops a friendship with Will.
 Ross Boatman as Vic Morgan (Series 5), a boxing trainer whom Will looks to for guidance.
 Shaun Dooley as Johnny Richards (Series 6), a lawyer and former war comrade of Geordie's.
 Ellora Torchia as Maya (Series 7), DCI Wallace's fiancé who has a brief affair with Will.

Production

Filming for the first series began in London, Cambridge and Grantchester from March to June 2014. The second series was filmed in autumn 2015, and guest stars included Neil Morrissey, Claudie Blakley, Nigel Planer, Andrew Knott, Nicky Henson and Oliver Dimsdale. The third series was filmed between August and November 2016, and filming for the fourth series commenced in June 2018. The fifth series was filmed in Cambridge and elsewhere during the summer of June 2019.

Grantchester itself is used for extensive filming, with the Church of St Andrew and St Mary used for the church interior and churchyard scenes. A private home in Lemsford, Hertfordshire, doubles as the vicarage, while the Windmill pub in Chipperfield is used for The Red Lion. King's Parade in Cambridge has been transformed to represent various 1950s street scenes, complete with period cars and buses. Horsted Keynes railway station, on the Bluebell Railway, in West Sussex has been used to double for Cambridge station.

Chatham Dockyard in Kent has doubled for various London locations, including the exterior of Kings Cross Station, Borough Market, and the exterior and interior of a warehouse and ropery. Commissioner's House was also used for filming.

After the third series, James Norton wanted to leave the series to pursue other acting opportunities. Also, actress Morven Christie had departed the show since her storyline involving Sidney Chambers and Amanda had concluded. Without Norton's participation, there was talk of ending the series, but Grantchester had proven to be so popular with television viewers that the producers felt that the show could continue with a new male lead.

At the start of the fourth series, actor Tom Brittney joined the cast as Will Davenport, a former inner-city chaplain who was appointed as Sidney Chambers' replacement as the Anglican vicar of Grantchester. James Norton made his last appearances as Sidney in the first two installments of the fourth season to help with the transition. At the end of the second episode, Sidney Chambers leaves Grantchester and moves to America. Starting with the third episode, actor Robson Green began receiving top billing in the opening credits. Also, with the addition of Brittney to the series, it gave the opportunity for the remaining cast members to expand their roles, particularly Kasey Ainsworth as Cathy Keating, Geordie's wife and Oliver Dimsdale as Daniel Marlowe, a local photographer who is also Leonard Finch's best friend and lover. Both Ainsworth's and Dimsdale's characters had been on the back burner for the last three years. By the time the fourth season had begun, Cathy was already working as a saleswoman in a department store and Daniel's relationship with Leonard had become more intimate and intense. The scenes around the Manor house owned by Will Davenport's parents were filmed in Rotherfield Park in East Hampshire.

The first episode of the fifth series continues to feature Will Davenport as vicar of Grantchester. The plot centres around the students of two colleges at the University of Cambridge: a 'prestigious all-female college' (the real-life women's college Newnham College, Cambridge) and a fictional men's college (filmed at St John's College, Cambridge). The sixth series expanded to eight episodes, rather than the standard six.

On 28 July 2021, ITV announced that filming for the seventh series of Grantchester had begun, with the series due for release on 11 March 2022, with Tom Brittney directing for the first time. On 19 August 2022, ITV announced that an eighth series had been commissioned and filming had begun, with its release scheduled for spring 2023.

Critical reception
The first episode was generally well received by the critics.  Michael Pilgrim of The Daily Telegraph wrote: "Delightfully neat and economical of plot, it’s Cluedo with cassocks and just enough noir for the modern palate. Victoria sponge with a tablespoon of battery acid." He added that "There could be a worse antidote than Grantchester"  in a grim October in the early 21st century. Ellen Jones of The Independent  thought the programme "delightful, a new treat for fans of period-set, gently paced detective series like Endeavour, and also for fans of top TV totty James Norton." Nancy deWolf Smith of The Wall Street Journal wrote, "Grantchester is a revelation."

The first series was given a Metacritic score of 70 based on 14 reviews, indicating a generally favourable reception.

Broadcast
The first series was broadcast in the UK on ITV starting 6 October 2014. The show premiered in the United States on 18 January 2015 on Masterpiece Mystery on PBS. It premiered in Australia on 28 February 2015 on ABC, as well as 9Gem. A French version premiered on France 3 from 12 July 2015. Series two was broadcast on PBS in the US from 27 March 2016. The series was licensed to Amazon Prime in a multi-year deal; that network gained the rights to air the episodes of all series after PBS affiliates had done so. On Amazon Prime, the 2016 Christmas Special listed in the Episodes section below is identified as Episode 1 of Series 3, with a total of seven episodes in the series.

Series overview

Official episode viewing figures are from BARB.

Episodes

Series 1 (2014)

Series 2 (2016)

Christmas Special (2016)

Series 3 (2017)

Series 4 (2019)

Series 5 (2020)

Series 6 (2021)

Series 7 (2022)

Series 8 (2023)
Episodes for the eighth series began production in August 2022. The storyline had reached the 1960s, similar decade to ITV's rival crime drama Endeavour.

All of the principal actors had returned and three new ones were added. The producers provided a few hints as to the relationships; not all was expected to go smoothly. "Unfortunately, it looks like Will and Geordie have some tough times ahead of them following the peaceful end to series seven."

References

External links
 
 
 ITV press pack
 The Grantchestermysteries.com

2014 British television series debuts
2010s British drama television series
2020s British drama television series
2010s British mystery television series
2020s British mystery television series
British detective television series
English-language television shows
ITV television dramas
Christian drama television series
Television shows based on British novels
Television series by Banijay
Television series set in the 1950s
Television shows set in Cambridgeshire
Television shows shot at Elstree Film Studios
TV series